Yoldia myalis, or the comb yoldia, is a clam in the family Yoldiidae. It can be found along the Atlantic coast of North America, ranging from Labrador to Massachusetts, as well as along the Alaskan coast.

References

Yoldiidae
Bivalves described in 1838